Khaki may refer to:

Khaki, East Azerbaijan
Khaki, Lorestan
Khaki Branazar
Khaki-ye Olya (disambiguation), various places
Khaki-ye Shekarabad
Khaki-ye Sofla
Khaki-ye Vosta